Marcel Legrain (14 June 1890 in Paris - 27 June 1915 à Neuville-Saint-Vaast) was a French rugby union player, who died in World War I. He was 1 m 80 tall and weighed 80 kg, and played  at second row and then, having played second line, and then third line (and then wing) in the national selection, and at the Stade Français.

Highlights

 12 caps for France from 1909-1914.
 Played in four editions of the Five Nations Championship, in 1910, 1911, 1913, and 1914. Thus, he played in the very first Five Nations Championship; he played in the first French win against a British team in the tournament, against Scotland on 2 January 1911.
 He was part of the French team's first victory against a British team when they beat Scotland on 2 January 1911, alongside his captain Marcel Communeau, who also played third line at the time.
 He also played in the first match against the South African Springboks in Bordeaux on 11 January 1913. (The second match didn't take place until 40 years later, in Paris.)

References
 Godwin, Terry Complete Who's Who of International Rugby (Cassell, 1987)

French military personnel killed in World War I
France international rugby union players
French rugby union players
1890 births
Rugby union players from Paris
1915 deaths
Rugby union locks